The Academy for Creating Enterprise is a private business college within the field of Micro-enterprise education. The objective of micro-enterprise education is to empower individuals with the skills and knowledge necessary to start their own businesses.

Description
The Academy is closely allied with the BYU Ballard Center for Economic Self-Reliance. As defined by the Micro-enterprise Education Initiative at the Ballard Center, “Microenterprises are defined as small businesses. They are prevalent throughout the developing work due to necessity enterprise. Where large companies that employ many are scarce and jobs are limited even with a degree, many have had to survive but starting their own businesses (microenterprises).” The Academy for Creating Enterprise relies upon this idea and hopes that individual lives will be transformed and poverty will be eradicated through education. The Academy's philosophy can be summarized by the following quote offered by Joseph F. Smith that appears on the website: "Our idea of charity, therefore, is to relieve present wants and then to put the poor in a way to help themselves so, in turn, they may help others."

History & Operations
Steve and Bette Gibson founded The Academy in 1999 in Cebu city, Philippines with the intent of providing basic business training to young Filipinos to start their own businesses. The Academy continues to have a base in the Philippines and it now has a campus in Mexico. The Academy currently has over 220 Chapters in Mexico, Peru, and the Philippines and is looking to continue to expand into Brazil and Africa. The Academy for Creating Enterprise is a non-profit organization with headquarters in Provo, Utah.  The business college is financed by independent donors, the Called2Serve Foundation, and by student tuition. The Academy also partners with the BYU Ballard Center to recruit interns interested in social innovation and micro-enterprise. The current program directors for The Academy’s campuses located in Cebu and Mexico City are Jacobo Albores (Mexico) and James O. Fantone (Philippines) – both native to their respective countries.

Programs
The Academy runs a five-week program that combines hands-on experience with classroom instruction, guest lecturers, and team innovation. Upon entering The Academy, students are placed into groups and begin income-generating activities. The students put into practice the concepts they learn in class through business activities in the marketplace. This program and materials developed by the Gibsons have been adopted by several other organizations around the world, including Ascend Alliance in their Bolivia micro-enterprise program. The program of The Academy centers on 25 “Rules of Thumb” developed by Steve and Bette Gibson to provide foundational business practices for entrepreneurs. During and upon completion of the program, students of The Academy are expected to use their skills to successfully navigate business ventures, and teach others.

While the Academy does not claim to higher aspirations, Brigham Young University - Hawaii has agreed to offer graduates of the Academy a certificate of completion, making the Academy for Creating Enterprise one of a small group of LDS institutions of higher education. In addition to the colleges officially sponsored by the LDS Church (BYU, BYU-Idaho, BYU-Hawaii, and the LDS Business College), the only other LDS Institutions of higher learning (albeit not officially sponsored by the Church) are Southern Virginia University and the Academy for Creating Enterprise. There is, however, a new initiative by the Acorn to Oak Foundation focused on building a privately funded LDS university in Argentina. If successful, that would bring the number of LDS institutions of higher learning (both officially sponsored and independent) to seven.

See also
 Microenterprise Education Initiative

References

External links 

Stoprmpoverty.com - Official website of the Academy for Creating Enterprise
marriottschool.byu.edu/selfreliance - Official website of The Ballard Center for Economic Self-Reliance

Latter Day Saint universities and colleges
Non-profit organizations based in Utah
Universities and colleges in Cebu City